The year 1872 in science and technology involved some significant events, listed below.

Chemistry
 Robert Chesebrough patents Vaseline in the United States
 Eugen Baumann rediscovers polyvinyl chloride
 Charles-Adolphe Wurtz discovers the aldol reaction

Conservation
 March 1 – Yellowstone National Park is established in the United States, the world's first national park

Exploration
 December 21 – Challenger expedition:  sails from Portsmouth in England on the 4-year scientific expedition that lays the foundation for the science of oceanography

Mathematics
 Richard Dedekind publishes Stetigkeit und irrationale Zahlen, a theory of irrational numbers
 Felix Klein produces the Erlangen program on geometries

Medicine
 February 15 – George Huntington makes the first detailed description of Huntington's disease, in Middleport, Ohio
 Moritz Kaposi describes Kaposi's sarcoma and the manifestations of systemic lupus erythematosus
 Ferdinand Monoyer proposes the dioptre as a unit for measuring the optical power of a lens

Physics
 Ludwig Boltzmann states the Boltzmann equation for the temporal development of distribution functions in phase space, and publishes his H-theorem

Technology
 April 2 – George Brayton obtains a United States patent for a constant pressure internal combustion engine, initially using vaporized gas, and marketed as 'Brayton's Ready Motor'.
 John Hopkinson proposes the group flash system for distinguishing lighthouses
 Reverend C. M. Ramus of Sussex, England, devises the single-step hydroplane hull

Institutions
 October 1 – the Virginia Agricultural and Mechanical College begins its first academic session
 The Polytechnic Museum in Moscow is founded

Publications
 May – the magazine Popular Science is first published in the United States
 Charles Darwin publishes The Expression of the Emotions in Man and Animals

Awards
 Copley Medal: Friedrich Woehler
 Wollaston Medal for geology: James Dwight Dana

Births
 April 5 – Samuel Cate Prescott (died 1962), American food scientist and microbiologist
 April 21 - Charles Gandy (died 1943), French physician.
 May 6 – Willem de Sitter (died 1934), Dutch mathematician, physicist and astronomer
 May 21 – Henry E. Warren (died 1957), American inventor
 May 31 – Charles Greeley Abbot (died 1973), American astrophysicist
 August 1 – Solomon Carter Fuller (died 1953), Liberian-born psychiatrist
 September 23 – Marie Depage (died in sinking of the RMS Lusitania 1915), Belgian nurse
 October 4 – Ernest Fourneau (died 1949), French medicinal chemist

Deaths
 March 8 – Priscilla Susan Bury (born 1799), English botanist
 April 2 – Samuel Morse (born 1791), American inventor
 May 6 – George Robert Gray (born 1808), English zoologist
 August 11 – Sir Andrew Smith (born 1797), Scottish-born military surgeon, explorer, ethnologist and zoologist
 August 22 – Pierre Charles Alexandre Louis (born 1787), French physician
 November 7 – Alfred Clebsch (born 1833), German mathematician
 December 6 – Félix Archimède Pouchet (born 1800), French scientist
 December 24 – William John Macquorn Rankine (born 1820), Scottish physicist
 Anne Elizabeth Ball (born 1808), Irish psychologist

References

 
19th century in science
1870s in science